The 2023 Japan Golf Tour will be a series of professional golf tournaments organised by the Japan Golf Tour Organization.

The season will have 26 tournaments with 25 being played in Japan and one in South Korea.

Schedule
The following table lists official events during the 2023 season.

Unofficial events
The following events were sanctioned by the Japan Golf Tour, but did not carry official money, nor were wins official.

Notes

References

External links

Japan Golf Tour
Japan Golf Tour
Golf Tour